The military budget of China is the portion of the overall budget of China that is allocated for the funding of the military of China. This military budget finances employee salaries and training costs, the maintenance of equipment and facilities, support of new or ongoing operations, and development and procurement of new weapons, equipment, and vehicles. Every March, as part of its annual state budget, China releases a single overall figure for national military expenditures.

In 2022, the official military budget was announced to be 1.45 trillion yuan (US$230 billion), the second largest in the world behind the US.

According to the Stockholm International Peace Research Institute, SIPRI, China became the world's fifth largest exporter of major arms in 2014–18, an increase of 2.7 per cent from the period 2010–2014. China supplied major arms to 53 states in 2014–18. Pakistan was the main recipient of these transfers, standing for 37%, whilst the remaining exports were small in volume, but with a wide variety of countries.

Official announcements
The Chinese government annually announce the budget for the internal security forces and the PLA at the National People's Congress in early March.

2014: the budget was announced to be US$131BN.
2015: the budget was announced to be US$141BN. At the same time, the Chinese government estimated the Chinese economy to grow 7% in 2015.
2016: the budget was announced to be 954.35 billion yuan which is about US$147BN, raised 6-7 % above last year's estimates.
2017: the budget was announced to be 1.044 trillion yuan ($151.4 billion), representing a 7% increase from the last year.
2018: the budget was announced to be 1.11 trillion yuan ($175 billion), which represents an 8.1% increase. This is China's largest defense budget raise in three years.
2019: the budget was announced to be 1.19 trillion yuan, which is an increase of 7.5%.
2020: the budget was announced to increase by 6.6% this year to 1.27 trillion yuan (US$178 billion).
2021: the budget was announced to be 1.35 trillion yuan (US$209 billion), an increase of 6.8%.
2022: the budget was announced to be 1.45 trillion yuan (US$230 billion), which is an increase of 7.1% over the last year.
2023: the budget was announced to be 1.55 trillion yuan (US$224 billion), which is an increase of 7.2% over the last year.

Unofficial estimates
Unofficial estimates place the total amount of military spending for China higher than the Chinese government figures, but these calculations tend to differ between organizations.

The last year that many international institutes provided estimates of Chinese military spending in comparable terms was 2003.  In terms of the prevailing exchange rate, SIPRI, RAND, the CIA and the DIA estimated the budget to be between US$30–65 billion. In terms of purchasing power parity, or the relative purchasing strength of the expenditure, the SIPRI estimate was as high as US$140 billion. The Chinese government's published budget at that time was less than US$25 billion.

A RAND Corporation study for year 2003 estimated China's defense spending to be higher than the official number but lower than United States Department of Defense calculations. The defense spending of China was estimated, in the mid-range estimate, to be 38 billion dollars or 2.3% of China's GDP in 2003. The official figure was 22.4 billion dollars. Nevertheless, Chinese military spending doubled between 1997 and 2003, nearly reaching the level of the United Kingdom and Japan, and it continued to grow over 10% annually during 2003–2005.

In 2010, the US Department of Defense's annual report to Congress on China's military strength estimated the actual 2009 Chinese military spending at US$150 billion. Stockholm International Peace Research Institute (SIPRI) estimates that the military spending of the People's Republic of China for 2009 was US$100 billion, higher than the official budget, but lower than the US DoD estimate.

The International Institute for Strategic Studies in a 2011 report argued that if spending trends continue China will achieve military equality with the United States in 15–20 years.

Jane's Defence Forecasts in 2012 estimated that China's defense budget would increase from $119.80 billion to $238.20 billion between 2011 and 2015. This would make it larger than the defense budgets of all other major Asian nations combined. This is still smaller than the estimated United States defense budget of $525.40 billion for 2013. However, United States defense spending is slightly declining.

In 2017, the magazine Popular Mechanics estimated that China's annual military spending is greater than $200 billion, around 2% of the GDP.

In 2019, Peter Robertson, a professor from the University of Western Australia, argued that using conventional currency conversion as opposed to more accurate "purchasing power parity" (PPP) exchange rates dramatically understated China's military capabilities and that China's real military spending was equivalent to US spending of $455 billion, calculated from a PPP perspective.

In 2022, the Stockholm International Peace Research Institute estimated the China's military spending is $230 billion dollars which accounted for 1.7% of the country total GDP.

Comparison with other countries

See also

List of countries by military expenditures
List of countries by number of military and paramilitary personnel

References

Military of the People's Republic of China
China
Government finances in China